Blue smoke may refer to:

Technology
 Blue smoke (electronics), a smoke coming out of malfunctioning electronic circuits
 Aerogel or blue smoke, a synthetic porous ultralight material derived from a gel
 Bluesmoke (Linux), the former name of a set of Linux kernel modules for handling hardware-related errors

Music
 "Blue Smoke", a 1949 song by Pixie Williams, written by Ruru Karaitiana
 "Blue Smoke", a 2013 song by Stone Sour from House of Gold & Bones – Part 2
 Blue Smoke (album), a 2014 album by Dolly Parton

Other uses
 Blue Smoke (2007 film), an American romantic drama television film
 Blue Smoke (book), a 2011 book by Chris Bourke
 Blue Smoke (1935 film), a British sports film